Zulu Alpha (foaled  February 8, 2013 in Kentucky) is an American Thoroughbred racehorse and the winner of the 2020 Pegasus World Cup Turf.

Career

Zulu Alpha's first race was on October 20, 2015, at Gowran Park Racecourse in County Kilkenny, Ireland where he came in second.

Returning to the United States, he picked up his first win on July 18, 2017, at Indiana Grand Race Course in Shelbyville, Indiana. He won again that month at the same track. His 2017 season ended with a third-place finish in the Prairie Bayou Stakes.

His 2018 season saw him come in third place at the Mervin H. Muniz Jr. Memorial Handicap on March 24. He picked up some wins during the summer in allowance optimal claiming races and earned his biggest victory at that time in the G3 Sycamore Stakes on October 18.

His 2019 season was his breakthrough year. He started off the season with a win in the G3 W. L. McKnight Handicap on January 26. His next race on March 2, 2019, also ended in a victory when he won the G2 Mac Diarmida Stakes. He came in third place in the G2 Elkhorn Stakes on April 20, 2019 and finished second in the G1 United Nations Stakes. He then won his last race of the 2019 season, capturing the G3 Kentucky Cup Turf Stakes.

Zulu Alpha began his 2020 season with his biggest win to date by winning the January 25th, 2020 G1 Pegasus World Cup Turf.

In the 2020 World's Best Racehorse Rankings, Zulu Alpha was rated on 118, making him the equal 80th best racehorse in the world.

Pedigree

References

2015 racehorse births
American racehorses
Racehorses bred in Kentucky
Racehorses trained in Ireland
Racehorses trained in the United States